Tatiana Zaitseva is a former football defender. Throughout her career she played for Kubanochka Krasnodar, Energiya Voronezh and Ryazan VDV. She was a member of the Russian national team, and played the 1999 and 2003 World Cups.

In 2007, she reestablished Kubanochka Krasnodar, which had been disbanded in 2000. She currently serves as the club's president and coach in the Russian women's football championship., but the club has been dissolved during 2019 season. In February 2020 she was appointed as manager of newly established WFC Krasnodar.

References

1978 births
Living people
Russian women's footballers
Russia women's international footballers
2003 FIFA Women's World Cup players
Women's association football defenders
1999 FIFA Women's World Cup players
Kubanochka Krasnodar players
Ryazan-VDV players
FC Energy Voronezh players
Russian Women's Football Championship players